The Hellenic Modelling Federation (or ELME) is a non profit organization pursuing the promotion of the radio controlled hobby and racing of all types of radio controlled cars in Greece. Founded in the mid 1990s by a group of R/C enthusiasts, with purpose of making this hobby known to Greece, the Federation has evolved through the years offering its members national championships and access to foreign events such as European and World championships.

At the current form, national events are organized for various classes throughout Greece in various locations and venues. ELME offers insurance for any accidents that might occur, to all the participating members. Each year ELME produces a rules booklet for every racing class, with specific directives regarding maximum and minimum dimensions, weight, homologated motors, batteries, fuel etc. These terms make sure the races organized are fair and no members shall have advantage against others, promoting the sports spirit and fair play.

Membership costs €30 per year and all members have the right to vote in the annual general meeting, have access to all events the federation is organizing if they pay their entry fee and are invited to the annual party together with their families.

ELME is a member of EFRA (European Federation Of Radio Operated Model Automobiles). ELME takes into serious consideration of EFRA rules and uses their lists of approved equipment used in model racing as guidance in order to form its own set of rules.

Greek Champions list

On-Road

1/10 EP Touring Modified

1/10 IC Touring

1/8 IC Track

1/12 EP Pan-car

1/8 IC GT

Off-Road

1/8 IC Buggy

1/10 EP Buggy 2WD

1/10 EP Buggy 4WD

External links 

 ELME website
 EFRA website
 https://www.el-me.gr/halloffame 
 https://www.redrc.net/2021/09/dimitris-ioannidis-crowned-mod-tc-greek-champion/ 
 https://www.redrc.net/2020/06/dimitris-ioannidis-takes-double-greek-ep-off-road-title/ 
 https://www.redrc.net/2018/11/tasos-paparegas-crowned-greek-national-champion/ 
 https://www.redrc.net/2017/11/greek-electric-off-road-championship-finale-report/ 
 https://www.redrc.net/2017/11/paparegas-takes-6th-consecutive-greek-ic-buggy-title/ 
 https://www.redrc.net/2017/10/bill-lykaris-takes-greek-national-110th-200mm-title/ 
 https://www.redrc.net/2015/10/john-doucakis-wins-at-greek-tc-nationals-rd3/ 
 https://www.redrc.net/2013/07/john-doucakis-wins-at-greek-tc-nats-rd3/ 
 https://www.redrc.net/2011/05/kostas-zacharopoulos-wins-18th-rd1-in-greece/ 
 https://www.redrc.net/2010/09/kostas-zacharopoulos-wins-greek-championship/ 
 https://www.redrc.net/2007/10/sotiropoulos-is-greek-18th-champion/ 
 https://www.redrc.net/2006/11/john-sotiropoulos-is-greek-18th-national-champion/ 
 https://circusrc.com/2021/11/ioannidis-kalantzakis-take-greek-ep-touring-title/ 
 https://circusrc.com/2021/09/dimitris-ioannidis-crowned-double-greek-1-10th-buggy-champion/ 
 https://circusrc.com/2021/09/dimitris-ioannidis-crowned-greek-1-10th-touring-modified-champion/ 
 https://circusrc.com/2020/09/dimitriou-dimitris-crowned-2020-greek-touring-champion/ 
 https://www.redrc.net/2020/07/isaakidis-maricholas-win-greek-ep-touring-titles/ 
 https://www.redrc.net/2015/10/nikos-georgiadis-takes-greek-national-title/

Radio-controlled car racing organizations
Radio car